Plutarch is a lunar impact crater that lies near the north-northeastern limb of the Moon, just to the south of the irregular crater Seneca. To the southeast is the flooded crater Cannon. The proximity of this crater to the limb causes it to appear foreshortened when viewed from the Earth, but it is actually a circular formation.

This crater has a well-defined rim edge that is only slightly eroded. A small crater intrudes slightly into the southwestern rim, and another small crater lies near the south-southeastern rim. The inner wall is unusually wide in the southern half of the crater, with the narrowest section along the northern rim. There is some slumping and terraces formed along the inner sides, and a notable central peak near the midpoint of the interior floor.

Satellite craters
By convention these features are identified on lunar maps by placing the letter on the side of the crater midpoint that is closest to Plutarch.

References

 
 
 
 
 
 
 
 
 
 
 
 

Impact craters on the Moon